Xinzhen (新镇) could refer to the following locations in China:

 Xinzhen Subdistrict, Fangshan District, Beijing
 Xinzhen, Hebei, in Wen'an County
 Xinzhen, Henan, town in Xun County